KXRQ (94.3 FM) is a radio station broadcasting a Top 40 (CHR) format. Licensed to Roosevelt, Utah, United States, the station is currently owned by Uinta Broadcasting, L.C. and features programming from Premiere Radio Networks and Westwood One.

References

External links

XRQ
Contemporary hit radio stations in the United States